Michael Kirkman (born 11 February 1942) is an English former first-class cricketer.

Kirkman was born at Bodmin in February 1942. He was educated at Dulwich College, before going up to St Catharine's College, Cambridge. While studying at Cambridge, he played first-class cricket for Cambridge University Cricket Club in 1963, making ten appearances. Playing as a leg break bowler in the Cambridge side, he took 14 wickets at an average of 52.92, with best figures of 3 for 32. As a tailend batsman, he scored 28 runs with a highest score of 7 not out.

References

External links

1942 births
Living people
People from Bodmin
People educated at Dulwich College
Alumni of St Catharine's College, Cambridge
English cricketers
Cambridge University cricketers